Zamia ulei is a species of plant in the family Zamiaceae. It is found in Brazil, Colombia, Ecuador, and Peru.

References

ulei
Near threatened plants
Taxonomy articles created by Polbot
Taxa named by Carl Lebrecht Udo Dammer